Edward Hay-Plumb (1883 in Norwich, Norfolk – 1960 in Uxbridge, Middlesex) was an English actor and film director.

He served as a lieutenant in the West Yorkshire Regiment during World War I.

Selected filmography

Director
 Hamlet (1913)
 A Son of David (1920)

Actor
 The Cloister and the Hearth (1913)
 The Heart of Midlothian (1914)
 The Professional Guest (1931)
 The Midshipmaid (1932)
 The House of Trent (1933)
 Channel Crossing (1933)
 Orders Is Orders (1934)
 Widow's Might  (1935)
 Things Are Looking Up (1935)
 Car of Dreams (1935)
 Song of the Forge (1937)
 Cheer Boys Cheer (1939)
 Let's Be Famous (1939)

References

External links

1883 births
1960 deaths
English male film actors
English film directors
20th-century English male actors